Elections to Liverpool City Council were held on 1 November 1928.

One third of the council seats were up for election. The term of office for each councillor being three years.

Thirteen of the thirty-nine seats up for election were uncontested.

After the election, the composition of the council was:

Election result

Ward results

* - Councillor seeking re-election

Comparisons are made with the 1925 election results.

Abercromby

Aigburth

Allerton

Anfield

Breckfield

Brunswick

Castle Street

Childwall

Croxteth

The proceedings of the Council lists this as a by-election caused by the death of Councillor John Ellis.

Dingle

Edge Hill

Everton

Exchange

Fairfield

Fazakerley

Garston

Granby

Great George

Kensington

Kirkdale

Little Woolton

Low Hill

Netherfield

North Scotland

Old Swan

Prince's Park

Sandhills

St. Anne's

St. Domingo

St. Peter's

Sefton Park East

Sefton Park West

South Scotland

Vauxhall

Walton

Warbreck

Wavertree

Wavertree West

West Derby

Aldermanic Elections

Aldermanic Elections 5 December 1928

Following the death on 23 March 1928 of Alderman Sir William Bower Forwood KBE DL (Conservative, last elected as an alderman on 9 November 1923), a poll of councillors was taken to elect his successor. Councillor Edwin Haigh (Conservative, Wavertree West, elected 1 November 1926) of San Rocque, Calderstones Road, Liverpool was elected as an alderman.

The term of office to expire on 9 November 1929.

Following the death of Alderman Jacob Reuben Grant(Liberal, last elected as an alderman on 9 November 1926), a poll of councillors was taken to elect his successor. Councillor Richard Rutherford JP (Party?, Castle Street, elected 1 November 1926) of 16 School Lane, Bidston, Birkenhead was elected as an alderman on 5 December 1928

The term of office to expire on 9 November 1932.

Aldermanic Elections 6 March 1929

Following the death on 11 December 1928 of Alderman The Right Honourable Sir Archibald Tutton Salvidge PC KBE LL.D.
(Conservative, last elected as an alderman on 9 November 1926)

In his place Councillor Edwin Thompson
(Conservative Abercromby, elected 1 November 1928), Manufacturing Chemist of 6 Livingston Drive North, Liverpool was elected as an alderman on 6 March 1929.

The term of office to expire on 9 November 19

Following the death on 19 December 1928 of Alderman John Edwards (Conservative, last elected as an alderman on 9 November 1923)

In his place Councillor Joseph Ashworth (Conservative, Kensington, elected 1 November 1926), builder and contractor of 30 Holt Road, Liverpool was elected in a poll of councillors as am alderman on 6 March 1929

The term of office to expire on 9 November 1929.

Following the death on 15 January 1929 of Alderman Arthur Stanley Mather CBE (Conservative, last elected as an alderman on 9 November 1923)

In whose place Councillor Herbert John Davis (Conservative, Childwall, elected 1 November 1927), solicitor of 11 Aigburth Drive, Liverpool was elected as an alderman in a poll of the councillors on 6 March 1929.

The term of office to expire on 9 November 1929.

Caused by the death on 29 January 1929 of Alderman William James Burgess(Conservative, last elected as an alderman on 9 November 1923).

In whose place Councillor Henry Langton Beckwith (Conservative, Wavertree, elected 1 November 1926), Architect and Surveyor of 4 Aigbirth Drive, Liverpool was elected as an alderman in a poll of the councillors on 6 March 1929

The term of office to expire on 9 November 1929.

Aldermanic Election 4 September 1929

Caused by the death on 26 February 1929 of Alderman Albert Edward Jacob MP (Unionist, last elected as an alderman on 9 November 1926), in whose place Councillor Joseph Dalton Flood JP (Conservative, Dingle,  last elected 1 November 1926), of 643 Borough Road, Birkenhead, being elected as an alderman in a poll of councillors on 4 September 1929.

The term of office to expire on 9 November 19

Aldermanic Election 23 October 1929

Caused by the resignation of Alderman Edward West (Liberal, elected as an alderman on 2 March 1927 which was reported to the council on 2 October 1929, in whose place Councillor William Wallace Kelly JP (Conservative, Dingle, last elected 1 November 1928) of the North Western Hotel, Liverpool was elected as an alderman in a poll of the councillors on 23 October 1929.

The term of office to expire on 9 November 1932.

By-elections

No. 10 Great George, 3 December 1928

Caused by the death of Councillor William Grogan (Catholic, Great George, elected 1 November 1926).

No. 33 Wavertree West, 17 December 1928

Caused by Councillor Edwin Haigh (Conservative, Wavertree West, elected 1 November 1926) being elected as an alderman on 5 December 1928, following the death on 23 March 1928 of Alderman Sir William Bower Forwood KBE DL.

The term of office to expire on 1 November 1929.

No. 7 Castle Street, 20 December 1928

Caused by the election as an alderman on 5 December 1928 of Councillor Richard Rutherford JP (Party?, Castle Street, elected 1 November 1926), following the death of Alderman Jacob Reuben Grant(Liberal, last elected as an alderman on 9 November 1926). Robert Garnett Sheldon, physician and surgeon of "Redholme", Victoria Road, Freshfield was the sole candidate.

The term of office to expire on 1 November 1929.

No. 26 West Derby, 29 January 1929

Caused by the death on 6 December 1928 of Councillor John Hickman Dovener (Conservative, West Derby, elected 1 November 1927)

The term of office to expire on 1 November 1930.

No. 3 South Scotland, 28 February 1929

Caused by the death on 24 January 1929 of Councillor Mary O'Shea(Catholic, South Scotland, elected 1 November 1927).
Michael John Reppion, Carting Agent of 11 Lowerson Crescent, West Derny, Liverpool was the sole candidate.

The term of office to expire on 1 November 1930.

No. 9 Abercromby, 16 April 1929

Caused by Councillor Edwin Thompson
(Conservative Abercromby, elected 1 November 1928), being elected as an alderman on 6 March 1929.

Following the death on 11 December 1928 of Alderman The Right Honourable Sir Archibald Tutton Salvidge PC KBE LL.D.
(Conservative, last elected as an alderman on 9 November 1926).

The term of office to expire on 1 November 1931

No. 19 Kensington, 16 April 1929

Caused by Councillor Joseph Ashworth (Conservative, Kensington, elected 1 November 1926), being elected in a poll of councillors as am alderman on 6 March 1929.

Following the death on 19 December 1928 of Alderman John Edwards (Conservative, last elected as an alderman on 9 November 1923).

Thomas Norman Jones, a solicitor of the Supreme Court of Judicature of 59 Marlowe Road, Wallasey, heshire was elected as a councillor for the Kensington ward

The term of office to expire on 1 November 1931

No. 34 Wavertree, 18 April 1929

Caused by Councillor Henry Langton Beckwith (Conservative, Wavertree, elected 1 November 1926) being elected as an alderman in a poll of the councillors on 6 March 1929, following the death on 29 January 1929 of Alderman William James Burgess(Conservative, last elected as an alderman on 9 November 1923).

The term of office to expire on 1 November 1929.

No. 38 Childwall, 18 April 1929

Caused by Councillor Herbert John Davis (Conservative, Childwall, elected 1 November 1927) being elected as an alderman in a poll of the councillors on 6 March 1929, following the death on 15 January 1929 of Alderman Arthur Stanley Mather CBE (Conservative, last elected as an alderman on 9 November 1923).

The term of office to expire on 1 November 1930.

No. 12 Dingle, 24 September 1929

Caused by Councillor Joseph Dalton Flood (Conservative, Dingle, last elected 1 November 1926) being elected as an alderman in a poll of councillors on 4 September 1929, following the death on 26 February 1929 of Alderman Albert Edward Jacob MP (Unionist, last elected as an alderman on 9 November 1926)

The term of office to expire on 1 November 1929.

See also

 Liverpool City Council
 Liverpool Town Council elections 1835 - 1879
 Liverpool City Council elections 1880–present
 Mayors and Lord Mayors of Liverpool 1207 to present
 History of local government in England

References

1928
1928 English local elections
November 1928 events
1920s in Liverpool